Jiken, the Japanese word for "incident", may refer to:

 The Incident (1978 film), a Japanese film
 Jiken series, a Japanese mystery novel series
 Jiken (Japanese term), a page about the word itself.